The North Fork Owyhee River is a tributary, about  long, of the Owyhee River in Malheur County, Oregon, and Owyhee County, Idaho, in the United States.

Named tributaries of the North Fork, from source to mouth, include Noon Creek, which enters from the right; Pleasant Valley Creek, left; and Juniper Creek, right, all on the Idaho side of the border. Further downstream on the Oregon side, Squaw Creek enters from the left, Cherry Creek from the right, and the Middle Fork Owyhee River from the left before the North Fork meets the main stem at Three Forks.

Wild and scenic designation
The upper  of the North Fork, from the upstream boundary of the North Fork Owyhee Wilderness to the Idaho–Oregon border, are part of the National Wild and Scenic Rivers System. Of this total,  are classified as wild and the remaining  are recreational. The lower  of the North Fork, from the Idaho–Oregon border to the main stem, is also classified as wild. It flows through a deep canyon rimmed with basalt. The Bureau of Land Management oversees the land along the river in both states.

Camping
Amenities include seven primitive campsites, picnic tables, fire grates, and a vault toilet but no drinking water.

Wilderness
It extends from the headwaters in Idaho almost to the border with Oregon. The wilderness is home to sage grouse, pronghorn, bighorn sheep, rare plants, and many other species.

See also
List of rivers of Idaho
List of rivers of Oregon

References

External links
 National Wild and Scenic Rivers System

.
Rivers of Idaho
Rivers of Malheur County, Oregon
Rivers of Owyhee County, Idaho
Rivers of Oregon
Wild and Scenic Rivers of the United States